Andriy Hryshchenko (born 3 October 1974) is a retired Ukrainian footballer.

He retired in 2008 while playing with FC Korosten in the Ukrainian Druha Liha. During his career he has played in Ukraine, Czech Republic, Poland and Croatia.

References

 

1974 births
Living people
Ukrainian footballers
Ukrainian expatriate footballers
Expatriate footballers in the Czech Republic
Expatriate footballers in Poland
Expatriate footballers in Croatia
FC Metalist Kharkiv players
FC Spartak Sumy players
FC Fastav Zlín players
Górnik Zabrze players
Górnik Łęczna players
Arka Gdynia players
NK Hrvatski Dragovoljac players
Association football forwards